David Buko (1972–2002) was a Papua New Guinean professional rugby league footballer who represented Papua New Guinea in the 1995 and 2000 World Cups.

Playing career
Buko began his career in the early 1990s and represented Northern Zone before first making the national side in 1993 after helping the Goroka Lahinis win the SP Cup grand final. He played for the national side in both the 1995 and 2000 World Cups.

In 1999, Buko joined the Western Suburbs Magpies, playing in eight games at both wing and fullback.  Buko played in the club's final ever game as a first grade side which was a 60-16 loss against Auckland at Campbelltown Stadium. The club merged with Balmain in 2000 to form the Wests Tigers and Buko was not retained, instead playing in Wagga.

Buko returned to Papua New Guinea and again played for the Goroka Lahinis and the national side. In the 2001 series against France his form was so impressive that the Limoux Grizzlies offered him a contract.

Buko played a total of 12 matches for Papua New Guinea between 1993 and 2001.

Buko died in January 2002, he had contracted typhoid in 2001 and had chronic fever at the time of his death.

References

1972 births
2002 deaths
Deaths from typhoid fever
Expatriate rugby league players in Australia
Goroka Lahanis players
Infectious disease deaths in Papua New Guinea
Papua New Guinea national rugby league team players
Papua New Guinean expatriate rugby league players
Papua New Guinean expatriate sportspeople in Australia
Papua New Guinean rugby league players
Rugby league fullbacks
Rugby league wingers
Western Suburbs Magpies players